Countryside Lake is a manmade lake located in Lake County Illinois. The private lake is in the center of the Countryside neighborhood and is designated for use by the CLA (Countryside Lake Association) and their guests. Countryside Lake was created in 1926 by putting a dam at the end of a boggy stream.  After the dam was created dredging equipment was brought to clear the surrounding area to expand the stream into a lake. Since Countryside Lake is manmade it is very shallow, at a maximum depth of  the lake is mostly recreational. The lake is around  so it is on the smaller side for a lake. Since the lake is so small, only boats with 15 horsepower or less are allowed on the lake, this is intended to keep the shoreline from deteriorating. Countryside Lake has one beach that has a lifeguard for most days of the summer months. At the beach there is a playground, horseshoes, and numerous docks for boats.

History
Countryside Lake was created by Samuel Insull in 1926. Since there was only a boggy stream when he started to make the lake, it was a difficult task. He began by damming the southeast end of the stream. Once the dam was built, the stream was transformed into a lake using dredging equipment to create the intended outline of the lake. Once Insull finished the lake, he built a hunting lodge on the lake that still stands today. The surrounding area of the lake is a neighborhood called Countryside. This neighborhood consists of Countryside Lake and Countryside Oaks.

Wildlife
Countryside Lake is home to many fish and has numerous birds that migrate through. Some of the fish that are in the lake are crappie, muskellunge, northern pike, walleye, largemouth bass, perch, bluegill, grass carp, sunfish, and catfish. Since the lake has all of these fish it is a common spot for fishing.

References

External links
 

Lakes of Lake County, Illinois
Reservoirs in Illinois